Bernd Walter Stange (born 14 March 1948) is a German football manager who last managed the Syria national team.

During his playing career, he played for Chemie Gnaschwitz, Vorwärts Bautzen, and HSG DHfK Leipzig as a defender.

Playing career
Born in Gnaschwitz, Doberschau-Gaußig, a Sorbian town of Saxony, Stange started playing at an early age and was called into the East German youth team. He continued to play for Chemie Gnaschwitz in the lower divisions until 1965 followed by a year at Vorwärts Bautzen. In 1966 he joined HSG DHfK Leipzig, playing until retiring in 1970, while also studying at the DHfK Leipzig (de) to become a sports teacher.

Coaching career

1970–91: Carl Zeiss Jena and East Germany national team
Upon completing his sports teacher degree, Stange went into coaching with Carl Zeiss Jena in 1970, winning the GDR Cup in 1973 and 1974 as assistant coach of Hans Meyer.

In late 1983, he was appointed head coach of East Germany after years working as assistant coach and head coach of the Under 21s. After a mediocre five-year spell with the national team without qualifying for a World Cup or European Championship final tournament, Stange returned, now as head coach in the GDR league, to FC Carl Zeiss Jena, in the autumn of 1989.

1991–94: Hertha BSC and VfB Leipzig; Stasi informer
Stange moved to coach Hertha BSC where his old ties as an informant for the East German police, the Stasi, surfaced. He was an 'Inoffizieller Mitarbeiter', which translates as 'unofficial employee'. His code name was 'IM Kurt Wegner'. His tasks included informing the Stasi about his players' views of the government and whether any of them were breaking the law by making contact with West Germans. He was sacked after these allegations surfaced.

1995–2001: Coaching abroad and third stint at Jena
After losing his job at VfB Leipzig, in 1995 he joined FC Dnipro Dnipropetrovsk. After the 1995–96 season Stange joined CSKA-Borysfen Kyiv.

In 1998, he joined Perth Glory in the Australian National Soccer League. Glory under Stange in 2000 won the NSL league title however failed in the Grand Final, losing on penalties to the Wollongong Wolves after leading 3–0 at half-time. Stange was very popular among supporters in Perth to the point where a demonstration was held to prevent him from being sacked. However, his abrupt nature with players and other club officials made him a number of enemies, leading to his departure at the completion of his contract.

2001–04: Oman and Iraq
In 2001, he was given the opportunity to guide Oman to the 2002 FIFA World Cup Korea/Japan but was fired after less than three months in the job.

Amid threats from the US President George W. Bush of a possible military conflict with Iraq, he arrived in Baghdad in October 2002 and put pen to paper to a four-year contract that included two clauses allowing him to leave in the event of war and to refuse any political comment.

2005–16: Final years and retirement
In 2005 Stange joined Apollon Limassol in Cyprus and helped them to avoid relegation. The following season Apollon won unbeaten the Cypriot Championship after 12 years. Also, Apollon won the Super Cup a few months later for the first time. He continued for the 2006–07 season but resigned in the middle of that season because his team was not doing well and lost its chance to win the Championship again.

On 30 July 2007, Stange was appointed by the Belarus Football Federation to coach the national team after previous manager Yuri Puntus resigned the month before due to a poor performance in the Euro 2008 qualifying. For his first game on 22 August, against Israel, Stange, to the surprise of fans and media called up many young players from the domestic league. His debut ended in a 2–1 impressive victory despite questionable positioning of players on the field. 

On 7 October 2011, Stange stood down from his post after the end of the UEFA Euro 2012 qualifying campaign.

Bernd Stange has often commented on his desire to eventually settle in Perth with his wife Dorothea.

On 15 May 2013, he was unveiled as the head coach of Singapore national football team. He ended his stint with Singapore in April 2016.

Stange openly criticized Singapore players for their lack of fitness and refusal to meet him personally for further fitness drills. 

Under his tutelage Singapore performed badly as they were eliminated from the 2014 AFF Championship where the "Lions" were a host nation. There were high expectations for the "Lions" because they won the last edition (2012). 

Despite that in 16 June 2015, they tied Japan 0–0 in a goalless draw at Saitama Stadium 2002. 

Stange retired on 14 July 2016.

2018: Return from retirement; Syria
In January 2018, the Syrian Football Association announced that from February 2018, Stange would be the new coach for the Syrian national team.

His salary was about 35 Thousand dollars which was about 30 times more than the former manager of the team Ayman Hakeem who managed the team during the final phase of 2018 FIFA World Cup qualification and led the team to the knockout stage. The salary was criticized many times by the press considering the situation in Syria, the poor results and performance of the team in 2019 Asian Cup and even in the friendly matches that preceded the tournament.

After heavy criticism and a poor showing during the first two matches of the 2019 AFC Asian Cup, which ended in a 0–0 draw against minnows Palestine and a sound 2–0 defeat from neighbours Jordan, the Syrian FA announced that Stange would be sacked immediately and replaced.

Current manager statistical summary 
The following table provides a summary of Stange as the Belarus, Singapore, and Syria manager, including in friendlies and competitive matches.

Key: P–games played, W–games won, D–games drawn; L–games lost, %–win percentage

References

External links
 
 
 "From bullets in Baghdad to Belarus", BBC profile of Bernd Stange, 14 October 2008

Hertha BSC managers
1948 births
Living people
Apollon Limassol FC managers
Expatriate football managers in Cyprus
German footballers
East German footballers
German football managers
Perth Glory FC managers
East German football managers
East Germany national football team managers
Oman national football team managers
Iraq national football team managers
Belarus national football team managers
Singapore national football team managers
FC Carl Zeiss Jena managers
1. FC Lokomotive Leipzig managers
Bundesliga managers
Footballers from Saxony
FC Dnipro managers
FC Arsenal Kyiv managers
Ukrainian Premier League managers
Expatriate soccer managers in Australia
Expatriate football managers in Belarus
Expatriate football managers in Ukraine
Expatriate football managers in Oman
Expatriate football managers in Iraq
Expatriate football managers in Singapore
German expatriate football managers
German expatriate sportspeople in Australia
German expatriate sportspeople in Ukraine
German expatriate sportspeople in Oman
German expatriate sportspeople in Singapore
Association football defenders
2019 AFC Asian Cup managers
People of the Stasi
Syria national football team managers
Expatriate football managers in Syria
German expatriate sportspeople in Belarus
German expatriate sportspeople in Iraq
German expatriate sportspeople in Syria
German expatriate sportspeople in Cyprus